Petrophyton is a genus of alga that falls in the coralline stem group.

See also

References

Red algae genera
Florideophyceae